Ping'an Avenue (English translation: "Peaceful Avenue") refers to a section of the road network in Beijing, China.

Ping'an Avenue is not the name of any particular road; it refers to the stretch of roads from Guanyuan Bridge on the western 2nd Ring Road through to Dongsishitiao Bridge on the eastern 2nd Ring Road.

Streets in Beijing